Vladimir Aleksandrovich Kazachyonok (6 September 1952 – 26 March 2017) was a Soviet football player and Russian coach. He was the academy director with FC Zenit Saint Petersburg until his death in 2017.

International career
Kazachyonok made his debut for USSR on December 1, 1976 in a friendly against Brazil. He also played in a UEFA Euro 1980 qualifier against Finland.

Death
On 26 March 2017, it was reported that Kazachyonok died in Saint Petersburg at the age of 64.

Honours
 Soviet Cup winner: 1977.

References

External links
  Profile

1952 births
2017 deaths
People from Kolpino
Russian footballers
Soviet footballers
Soviet Union international footballers
Soviet Top League players
FC Dynamo Moscow players
FC Zenit Saint Petersburg players
Russian football managers
FC Dynamo Saint Petersburg managers
FC Khimki managers
Russian Premier League managers
JK Sillamäe Kalev managers
Association football forwards
Burials at Serafimovskoe Cemetery
Expatriate football managers in Estonia